ADI 3510 (April 29, 2008), is a landmark Brazil Supreme Court case. The minister relator Carlos Ayres Britto voted in favor of embryonic stem cell research (Biosecurity Law).

High Court decision

Judiciary representation

Legislative representation

Executive representation

See also

 Stem cell laws
 Stem cell research
 Stem cell

References

Brazilian legislation
Stem cells